Aaron Tod Gryder (born June 5, 1970, in West Covina, California) is an American Thoroughbred horse racing jockey.

Career 
At age 16 in 1986, Gryder began his career as a professional jockey in Tijuana, Mexico at Agua Caliente Racetrack. His first winner came in 1987 at Agua Caliente aboard Ragen Henry.  Gryder returned to the United States to ride at Santa Anita Park. His first win came on long shot horse with no left eye named One Eyed Romeo. He later rode at Hollywood Park as an apprentice jockey, and became the first and only apprentice jockey to ever win the Leading Rider title in the track's 75-year history. Gryder has also won several Leading Rider titles at Churchill Downs, Arlington Park, Aqueduct Racetrack, and Golden Gate Fields.

In 2009, Gryder rode Well Armed to a win in the world's richest race, the $6,000,000 Dubai World Cup, finishing 14 lengths in front of Gloria De Campeao, the largest margin of victory in the history of the race. Gryder won the 2012 G1 Breeders' Cup Marathon on long shot Calidoscopio. At the time of his retirement, Gryder had more than 4,000 victories internationally,

Beyond racing, Gryder appeared in television's Dellaventura and The Sopranos. He has worked as an On-Air Analyst for ESPN, NBC Sports, Fox Sports, TVG Network, and HRTV. He was one of the six jockeys featured in Animal Planet's 2009 reality documentary, Jockeys. Gryder retired from racing in 2020. He joined Stronach Group in 2021 as Vice President of racing industry relations.

Year-end charts

References

External links
 Aaron Gryder on the NTRA site
 

1970 births
Living people
American jockeys
Gryder|Aaron